The 2022 Trophée des Championnes was the 2nd edition of the French Super Cup. The match was contested by the 2021–22 Division 1 Féminine champions, Lyon, and the 2021–22 Coupe de France Féminine winners, Paris Saint-Germain. The match was played at the Stade Marcel-Tribut in Dunkirk on 28 August 2022.

Match

Details

Notes

References

External links
  (in French)

Olympique Lyonnais Féminin matches
Paris Saint-Germain Féminine
2022–23 in French football